Biological databases are libraries of biological sciences, collected from scientific experiments, published literature, high-throughput experiment technology, and computational analysis.  They contain information from research areas including genomics, proteomics, metabolomics, microarray gene expression, and phylogenetics. Information contained in biological databases includes gene function, structure, localization (both cellular and chromosomal), clinical effects of mutations as well as similarities of biological sequences and structures.

Biological databases can be classified by the kind of data they collect (see below). Broadly, there are molecular databases (for sequences, molecules, etc.), functional databases (for physiology, enzyme activities, phenotypes, ecology etc), taxonomic databases (for species and other taxonomic ranks), images and other media, or specimens (for museum collections etc.) 

Databases are important tools in assisting scientists to analyze and explain a host of biological phenomena from the structure of biomolecules and their interaction, to the whole metabolism of organisms and to understanding the evolution of species. This knowledge helps facilitate the fight against diseases, assists in the development of medications, predicting certain genetic diseases and in discovering basic relationships among species in the history of life.

Technical basis and theoretical concepts 
Relational database concepts of computer science and Information retrieval concepts of digital libraries are important for understanding biological databases.  Biological database design, development, and long-term management is a core area of the discipline of bioinformatics.  Data contents include gene sequences, textual descriptions, attributes and ontology classifications, citations, and tabular data.  These are often described as semi-structured data, and can be represented as tables, key delimited records, and XML structures.

Access

Most biological databases are available through web sites that organise data such that users can browse through the data online. In addition the underlying data is usually available for download in a variety of formats. Biological data comes in many formats. These formats include text, sequence data, protein structure and links.  Each of these can be found from certain sources, for example:

Text formats are provided by PubMed and OMIM.
Sequence data is provided by GenBank, in terms of DNA, and UniProt, in terms of protein.
Protein structures are provided by PDB, SCOP, and CATH.

Problems and challenges

Biological knowledge is distributed among countless databases. This sometimes makes it difficult to ensure the consistency of information, e.g. when different names are used for the same species or different data formats. As a consequence, inter-operability is a constant challenge for information exchange. For instance, if a DNA sequence database stores the DNA sequence along the name of a species, a name change of that species may break the links to other databases which may use a different name. Integrative bioinformatics is one field attempting to tackle this problem by providing unified access. One solution is how biological databases cross-reference to other databases with accession numbers to link their related knowledge together (e.g. so that the accession number stays the same even if a species name changes). Redundancy is another problem, as many databases must store the same information, e.g. protein structure databases also contain the sequence of the proteins they cover, their sequence, and their bibliographic information.

Model-organism databases 

Species-specific databases are available for some species, mainly those that are often used in research (model organisms). For example, EcoCyc is an E. coli database.  Other popular model organism databases include Mouse Genome Informatics for the laboratory mouse, Mus musculus, the Rat Genome Database for Rattus, ZFIN for Danio Rerio (zebrafish),  PomBase  for the fission yeast Schizosaccharomyces pombe, FlyBase  for Drosophila, WormBase for the nematodes Caenorhabditis elegans and Caenorhabditis briggsae, and Xenbase for Xenopus tropicalis and Xenopus laevis frogs.

Biodiversity and species databases 

Numerous databases attempt to document the diversity of life on earth. A prominent example is the Catalogue of Life, first created in 2001 by Species 2000 and the Integrated Taxonomic Information System. The Catalogue of Life is a collaborative project that aims to document taxonomic categorization of all currently accepted species in the world. The Catalogue of Life provides a consolidated and consistent database for researchers and policymakers to reference. The Catalogue of Life curates up-to-date datasets from other sources such as Conifer Database, ICTV MSL (for viruses), and LepIndex (for butterflies and moths). In total, the Catalogue of Life draws from 165 databases as of May 2022. Operational costs of the Catalogue of Life are paid for by the Global Biodiversity Information Facility, the Illinois Natural History Survey, the Naturalis Biodiversity Center, and the Smithsonian Institution.

Some biological databases also document geographical distribution of different species. Shuang Dai et al. created a new multi-source database to document spatial/geographical distribution of 1,371 bird species in China, as existing databases had been severely lacking in spatial distribution data for many species. Sources for this new database included books, literature, GPS tracking, and online webpage data. The new database displayed taxonomy, distribution, species info, and data sources for each species. After completion of the bird spatial distribution database, it was discovered that 61% of known species in China were found to be distributed in regions beyond where they were previously known.

Medical databases 

Medical databases are a special case of biomedical data resource and can range from bibliographies, such as PubMed, to image databases for the development of AI based diagnostic software. For instance, one such image database was developed with the goal of aiding in the development of wound monitoring algorithms. Over 188 multi-modal image sets were curated from 79 patient visits, consisting of photographs, thermal images, and 3D mesh depth maps. Wound outlines were manually drawn and added to the photo datasets. The database was made publicly available in the form of a program called WoundsDB, downloadable from the Chronic Wound Database website.

Nucleic Acids Research Database Issue 
An important resource for finding biological databases is a special yearly issue of the journal Nucleic Acids Research (NAR). The Database Issue of NAR is freely available, and categorizes many of the public biological databases. A companion database to the issue called the Online Molecular Biology Database Collection lists 1,380 online databases. Other collections of databases exist such as MetaBase and the Bioinformatics Links Collection.

See also
Biobank
Biological data
Chemical database
Death Domain database
European Bioinformatics Institute 
Gene Disease Database
Integrative bioinformatics
List of biological databases
Model organism databases
NCBI
PubMed (a database of biomedical literature)

References

External links
 Interactive list of biological databases, classified by categories, from Nucleic Acids Research, 2010
 DBD: Database of Biological Databases
Biosharing (a database of biological databases)
 Chronic Wounds Database WoundsDB
 Catalogue of Life Catalogue of Life